Edelman is a surname. Notable people with the surname include:
 Abram Wolf Edelman (a.k.a. Abraham Edelman; 1832–1907), Polish-born American rabbi; the first rabbi in Los Angeles, California
 Adam Edelman (born 1991), American-born four-time Israeli national champion in skeleton event, and Israeli Olympian
 Alan Edelman (born 1963), American mathematician and computer scientist
 Alex Edelman (born 1989), American stand-up comedian
 Cornelis Hendrik "Cees" Edelman (1903–1964), Dutch soil scientist
 Daniel Edelman (1920–2013), American public relations executive, founder of Edelman
 David Louis Edelman (born 1971), American science fiction author
 Edmund D. Edelman (1930–2016), Los Angeles, California, politician
 Elazer R. Edelman, American engineer, scientist, and cardiologist
 Eric S. Edelman, U.S. ambassador to Turkey and Under Secretary of Defense for Policy
 Gerald Edelman (1929–2014), biologist, 1972 Nobel Prize (Physiology/Medicine) for work on the immune system
 Gregg Edelman (born 1958), American movie, television and theatre actor
 Herb Edelman (1933–1996), American actor
 Isidore Edelman (1920–2004), American physician and researcher
 James Edelman (born 1974), a justice of the Federal Court of Australia, and appointed to be a justice of the High Court of Australia
 Judith Edelman (1923–2014), American architect
 Julian Edelman (born 1986), NFL player for the New England Patriots, 2019 Super Bowl LIII MVP
 Julius Edelman (1924–2004), jazz photographer known as Skippy Adelman
 Lee Edelman (born 1953), professor and chair of the English Department at Tufts University
 Marek Edelman (1922–2009), political and social activist, cardiologist, and the last living leader of the Warsaw Ghetto uprising
 Marian Wright Edelman (Marian Wright) (born 1939), founder and president of the Children's Defense Fund and wife of Peter Edelman
 Maurice Edelman  (1911–1975), British politician and novelist
 Murray Edelman (1919–2001), American political scientist
 Natan Eidelman (1930–1989), Russian author and historian
 Nufar Edelman (born 1982), Israeli Olympic sailor
 Peter Edelman (born 1938), lawyer, policy maker, and law professor at Georgetown University Law Center and husband of Marian Wright Edelman
 Randy Edelman (born 1947), American music composer
 R. David Edelman, American policymaker
 Richard Edelman (born 1954), president and CEO of public relations firm Edelman
 Scott Edelman (born 1955), American science fiction and fantasy writer and editor

See also
 Edelman (firm), an American public relations firm
 Edelman v. Jordan, 1974 United States Supreme Court (11th amendment)

 Edelmann
 Adleman

Jewish surnames
Yiddish-language surnames